The University of Melbourne is a public research university located in Melbourne, Australia. Founded in 1853, it is Australia's second oldest university and the oldest in Victoria. Its main campus is located in Parkville, an inner suburb north of Melbourne's central business district, with several other campuses located across Victoria.

Incorporated in the 19th century by the colony of Victoria, the University of Melbourne is one of Australia's six sandstone universities and a member of the Group of Eight, Universitas 21, Washington University's McDonnell International Scholars Academy, and the Association of Pacific Rim Universities. Since 1872, many residential colleges have become affiliated with the university, providing accommodation for students and faculty, and academic, sporting and cultural programs. There are ten colleges located on the main campus and in nearby suburbs.

The university comprises ten separate academic units and is associated with numerous institutes and research centres, including the Walter and Eliza Hall Institute of Medical Research, Florey Institute of Neuroscience and Mental Health, the Melbourne Institute of Applied Economic and Social Research and the Grattan Institute. The university has fifteen graduate schools, including the Melbourne Business School, the Melbourne Law School and the Melbourne Medical School.

Times Higher Education ranked the University of Melbourne first in Australia and 34th globally in 2023, while the Academic Ranking of World Universities places it 35th in the world. Four Australian prime ministers and five governors-general have graduated from the University of Melbourne. Eight Nobel Laureates have taught, studied and researched at the University of Melbourne, the most of any Australian university.

The university's coat of arms is a blue shield on which a depiction of "Victory" in white colour holds her laurel wreath over the stars of the Southern Cross. The motto, Postera crescam laude ("Later I shall grow by praise" or, more freely, "We shall grow in the esteem of future generations"), is written on a scroll beneath the shield. The Latin is from a line in Horace's Odes: ego postera crescam laude recens.

History

Foundations of the university 

The University of Melbourne was established following a proposal by Hugh Childers, the Auditor-General and Finance Minister, in his first Budget Speech on 4November 1852, who set aside a sum of £10,000 for the establishment of a university. The university was established by Act of Incorporation on 22 January 1853, with power to confer degrees in arts, medicine, laws and music. The act provided for an annual endowment of £9,000, while a special grant of £20,000 was made for buildings that year. The foundation stone was laid on 3July 1854, and on the same day the foundation stone for the State Library Classes commenced in 1855 with three professors and sixteen students; of this body of students only four graduated. The original buildings were officially opened by the Lieutenant Governor of the Colony of Victoria, Sir Charles Hotham, on 3October 1855.

A law school was established in 1857 at the Parkville campus, following which a Faculty of Engineering and School of Medicine were established in 1861 and 1862 respectively. The university's residential colleges were first opened on the northern aspect of the campus in 1872, divided between the four main Christian denominations.

The first chancellor, Redmond Barry (later Sir Redmond), held the position until his death in 1880. The inauguration of the university was made possible by the wealth resulting from Victoria's gold rush. The institution was designed to be a "civilising influence" at a time of rapid settlement and commercial growth. In 1881, the admission of women was a seen as victory over the more conservative ruling council. Julia 'Bella' Guerin graduated with a Bachelor of Arts in 1883, and became the first woman to graduate from an Australian University.

1900s–1970s 

Early in the 1900s, the university expanded its offerings to more utilitarian courses. In 1901 the number of students enrolled at the University of Melbourne exceeded 500 students for the first time. The university established the Diploma of Education in 1903, following negotiations with the Victorian Education Department.

Despite the economic depression of the 1890s and the discovery of a significant fraud by a university registrar in 1901, the university continued to expand during this period. This growth included the construction of several buildings between 1900 and 1906. Such growth was facilitated largely through an increased government funding allocation, and the coinciding university led funding campaign. To accompany the training dentists received by the Melbourne Dental Hospital, a School of Dentistry was established to teach the scientific basis of dentistry at the university. Agriculture was established in 1911 following the appointment of the State Director of Agriculture as the first professor. During this period the university became a notable site for research, emerging as a leader in Australia. Following World War II the demand for higher education increased rapidly, and as a result became a transformative period for the university.

In 1940, the first issue of Historical Studies: Australia and New Zealand, now Australian Historical Studies, was published by the Department of History.

1980s – 2000s: Consolidation and expansion 

Expansion of the university increased significantly during the 1980s and 1990s, as the university amalgamated with a number of tertiary colleges. In 1988 the Melbourne Teachers' College was brought into the Faculty of Education, and the amalgamation lead to the formation of a distinctly new Faculty of Education. The College of Advanced Education was incorporated into the university in 1989. During this period, more students than ever before were attending the university. The university had expanded its student population to beyond 35,000 students. Such amalgamations continued into the 1990s, with the Victorian College of the Arts affiliation with the University of Melbourne in 1992. This increased the number of campuses for the University of Melbourne.

In 2001, the Melbourne School of Population Health was established, the first of its kind in Australia, and continued the growth of the university. Work at the centre involved contributions from many disciplines, ranging from the social sciences to epidemiology. Health fields such as Indigenous, women's, mental, sexual, and rural health have all been researched at the centre.

In 2008, Vice Chancellor Glyn Davis introduced a major restructure of the university's curriculum. The new structure, named the Melbourne Model, replaced traditional undergraduate specialist degrees with a two-degree undergraduate/graduate structure. Over 100 undergraduate degrees were replaced with six generalist degrees, with students taking a general bachelor's degree before specialising in either a professional or research graduate course. The introduction of the model, influenced by North American academia and the Bologna process, was controversial among students and staff. Various groups, including trade and student unions,

 academics,
 and some students criticised the introduction of the new structure, citing job and subject cuts, and a risk of "dumbing down" content. A group of students produced a satirical musical about the model's adoption. A dean from Monash University rejected the model and argued it led to a reduction in student applications to the University of Melbourne. The University of Western Australia is the only other Australian university to adopt the structure. Davis also introduced reforms to university governance, making faculty deans more responsible for producing a financial surplus.

2010s – present: Restructure and casualisation 
Between 2013 and 2015 Davis introduced a wide-reaching restructure of the university's administration, labelled the Business Improvement Program, which led to the sacking of 500 administrative staff and some administrative responsibilities being transferred to academic staff. At the same time in the ten years to 2018 the university embarked on a large capital works program, spending $2 billion on new buildings across the university's campuses. The Melbourne School of Land and Environment was disestablished on 1January 2015. Its agriculture and food systems department moved alongside veterinary science to form the Faculty of Veterinary and Agricultural Sciences, while other areas of study, including horticulture, forestry, geography and resource management, moved to the Faculty of Science in two new departments. In 2019, allegations of a toxic workplace culture within the Faculty of Arts were aired, with a number of senior staff leaving their positions. At the same time, there was controversy over the high salaries earned by the Vice Chancellor, with Davis earning $1.5 million in 2019, the most of any university head in Australia.

Like other Australian Universities, an extraordinary growth in international students took place at the University of Melbourne and meant the university became increasingly reliant on revenue from its overseas student cohort.

In 2020, on-campus teaching was limited to selected clinical placements as a result of social distancing restrictions required by the Victorian State Government in response to the COVID-19 pandemic. The majority of teaching was moved to online delivery during the first semester. Like many other institutions and workplaces, university faculty members elected to use telecommunication platforms such as Zoom Video Communications, Microsoft Teams, or Skype to conduct live tutorials and provide interactive online learning experiences as a result of the suspension of face-to-face teaching during this time period.

In 2020 the university announced it was axing 450 staff in the institution's largest ever layoff of academic staff, despite a planned expenditure of $4.2 billion for capital works over the decade from 2020. Similarly, in semester two of 2021, the majority of teaching was once again moved to online delivery due to the outbreak of the Delta variant of COVID-19 and ensuing lockdowns in Victoria. In response the university announced further job losses, despite the university running an $8m surplus in 2020. Eleven subjects were cut as part of the savings measures including a number of specialist scientific subjects, a move criticised by Nobel Laureate Peter Doherty and others. The halting of international student arrivals as part of the Australian pandemic response was projected to cause a major loss in revenue for the university.

In 2019 and 2020 the University was also involved in wage theft and underpayment controversies towards its large teaching workforce of casual staff, and began repaying casual tutors for unpaid marking. The university was accused of owing Faculty of Arts teaching staff an estimated $6 million. In 2021 the Vice-Chancellor issued an apology for systematically underpaying staff, saying there was “a systemic failure of respect from this institution" towards casual staff that resulted in underpaying 1,000 staff members and requiring the university to pay back $9.5 million. The university came under sustained criticism over the poor employment and financial conditions of its highly casualised academic workforce. Over the 2010s the university increasingly casualised its workforce, with reports that between 47 and 72 per cent of its 11,000 employees were on casual contracts by 2020.

In 2021 the State Government granted planning approval for a new campus for the university at the urban renewal precinct Fisherman's Bend. The $2 billion campus, set to open in 2025, will focus on engineering and forms part of a large capital works program by the university, which includes the demolition of Union House and the construction of a new student precinct on the south-east corner of the Parkville campus.

In June 2021, a new speech policy was implemented to protect and safeguard transgender individuals within the university.

Campuses

The university has three other campuses in metropolitan Melbourne at Burnley, Southbank, and Werribee. The Burnley campus is where horticultural courses are taught. Performing arts, visual arts, film and television, and music courses are taught at the Southbank campus. Veterinary science is taught at the Werribee campus.

In regional Victoria, the Creswick and Dookie campuses are used for forestry and agriculture courses respectively. They previously housed several hundred residential students, but are now largely used for short courses and research. The Shepparton campus is home to the Rural Health Academic Centre for the Faculty of Medicine, Dentistry and Health Sciences.

The university is a part-owner of the Melbourne Business School, based at Parkville campus, which ranked 46th in the 2012 Financial Times global rankings.

Parkville 

The Parkville campus is the primary campus of the university. Originally established in a large area north of Grattan Street in Parkville, the campus has expanded well beyond its boundaries, with many of its newly acquired buildings located in the nearby suburb of Carlton. The university is undertaking an "ambitious infrastructure program" to reshape campuses. The campus was founded in 1853, and is located just north of Melbourne's central business district. There are cafés, gyms, 12 university libraries, specialty stores, a small supermarket, and a seasonal farmers market located on the Parkville campus. The campus is located within a broader knowledge precinct, which encompasses eight hospitals, and many other leading research institutes.

Several of the earliest campus buildings, such as the Old Quadrangle and Baldwin Spencer buildings, feature period architecture. The old quad underwent extensive restoration in 2019 to return to original design, including a dedicated temporary exhibition space in the Treasury Gallery. The new Wilson Hall replaced the original building which was destroyed by fire.

Recipients of the University of Melbourne Award (see below) are acknowledged by bronze commemorative plaques along Professors Walk on this campus.

The Parkville campus was used extensively to shoot interior and exterior scenes in the MIFF-funded The Death and Life of Otto Bloom starring Twilight actor Xavier Samuel and Golden Globe nominee Rachel Ward.

The Union and Guild Theatres are located within the Union House on the Parkville campus.

Southbank 

The Southbank campus is home to the Victorian College of the Arts and the Melbourne Conservatorium of Music, and is situated within Melbourne's creative arts precinct. Theatre and dance stages, film and television studios, visual arts studios, and concert halls are all located at the university's purpose-built creative arts home.

A$200 million major capital works project at the campus was completed in 2019. The project includes the construction of a new state-of-the-art conservatorium for music and the conversion of historically important buildings for use as education and research facilities.

In 2011, the Victorian State Government allocated $24 million to support arts education at the VCA. This was due in part to it coming together with the Conservatorium to form the then Faculty of the Victorian College of the Arts and the Melbourne Conservatorium of Music.

Burnley 

The Burnley Campus is located within the suburb of Burnley in Melbourne, around 5 km east of the Melbourne CBD. The campus is dedicated to both ornamental and environmental horticulture, and is surrounded by nine hectares of heritage-listed gardens. The campus began operating as a learning precinct in horticultural education in 1891. At the campus, students are offered short courses, associate degrees, post-graduate studies, and research. Specifically, training for urban landscape management, landscape design and production, park management, turf management, nursery and cut flower production, and arboriculture are all specialisations of the campus.

Creswick 

The Creswick campus is located within the township of Creswick, 120 km north-west of Melbourne. It is situated on 15 hectares of land, in is also connected native and plantation forests. Accommodation is available at the campus to members of the University of Melbourne's student cohorts and teaching staff when engaged at Creswick. Creswick campus has been offering forest science education since 1910, and is Australia's only dedicated forest ecosystem science campus, which focuses on forest industry, conservation, and molecular biology research. Scientists based at the campus include hydrologists, soil scientists, plant geneticists, geomorphologists, fire scientists, ecologists, engineers, and mathematicians.

Dookie 

The Dookie campus has been the university's rural home to agriculture and agricultural teaching and learning since its inception in 1886. It is based between Shepparton and Benalla, about 220 km north east of Melbourne. Dookie campus is situated on 2440 hectares of land that houses student and staff accommodation, an orchard, winery, merino sheep, robotic dairy, and a natural bush reserve. Agriculture students are able to access the city campus in addition to a semester at the Dookie campus. Subjects in agriculture, science, commerce, and environments are available at the campus.

Shepparton 

The Shepparton Medical Centre campus is located in Shepparton, nearly 200 km north of Melbourne. The campus is part of the Melbourne Medical School, and the Shepparton base is home to the Shepparton Rural Clinical School. It provides fully furnished, subsidized, self-catered student on site at the Clinical School. The University of Melbourne Shepparton Medical Centre was the first purpose built teaching clinic in Australia, and services Shepparton and surrounds with comprehensive primary healthcare.

Werribee 

The Werribee campus is located about 30 km south west of the city, and is home to research and teaching for the Melbourne Veterinary School. Recently the campus undertook an AU$63 million redevelopment to enhance facilities for pet treatment and the training of future veterinarians at the University of Melbourne. Victoria's only accredited veterinary course is based at The University of Melbourne, at both the Werribee and Parkville campuses. Kendall Hall offers self-catered accommodation for 76 residents in single bedrooms with shared facilities at the University of Melbourne Werribee campus.

Former campuses

The university had a number of former campuses, including Glenormiston (now Glenormiston College), Longerenong (now Longerenong College), McMillan (based in Leongatha and Warragul) and the Werribee-based Gilbert Chandler Campus.

Organisation and administration

Governance 

Governance of the university is grounded in an act of parliament, the University of Melbourne Act 2009. The peak governing body is the "Council" the key responsibilities of which include appointing the vice-chancellor and principal, approving the strategic direction and annual budget, establishing operational policies and procedures and overseeing academic and commercial activities as well as risk management. The chair of the council is the "chancellor". The "academic board" oversees learning, teaching and research activities and provides advice to the council on these matters. The "committee of convocation" represents graduates and its members are elected in proportion to the number of graduates in each faculty.

The University of Melbourne's operations are governed through a hierarchy of delegations framework. A 13-member council is the university's governing body. It establishes the university's council, determines its core functions, and allows the university to enact subordinate legislation through statutes and regulations. Under legislative elements associated with the council, university policies exist as a formal statement of principle to regulate university operations. Under university policies, university processes exist to support workplace agreements, policy, and relevant legislation by noting day-to-day operation tasks and activities to be performed by staff.

The academic board is held responsible to the council for quality assurance in activities such as the maintenance of high standards in teaching, research and learning. The University of Melbourne Executive is the university's principal management committee. The university consists of academic and administrative structures. University leadership encompasses the chancellor, vice-chancellor and senior executives, who are responsible for the strategic vision of the university.

Endowment 

The University of Melbourne has an endowment of approximately $1.335 billion, the largest of any Australian tertiary institution.

The university's endowments recovered after hardship following the 2008 Great Recession, which shrank its investments by 22%. This required restructuring of the university, including cutting 220 full-time positions. A further round of cuts, driven by lingering concerns about finances and declining Federal contributions to the tertiary sector, took place under the 'Business Improvement Program' from 2014 to 2016 and resulted in the cutting of 500 jobs.

Under former vice-chancellor Glyn Davis, the university publicly launched a fundraising campaign titled Believe in 2013. The campaign raised $500 million by 2016 and sought to raise a further $1 billion by 2021.

Faculties and present deans 

The University of Melbourne is divided into 10 faculties, which encompass all major departments of both research and teaching.

Faculty of Architecture, Building and Planning: Julie Willis.
Faculty of Arts: Russell Goulbourne.
Faculty of Business and Economics: Paul Kofman and Ian Harper (co-deans).
Melbourne Graduate School of Education: Jim Watterston.
Faculty of Engineering and Information Technology: Mark Cassidy.
Faculty of Fine Arts and Music: Marie Sierra.
Melbourne Law School: Pip Nicholson.
Faculty of Medicine, Dentistry and Health Sciences: Jane Gunn.
Faculty of Science: Moira O'Bryan.
Faculty of Veterinary and Agricultural Sciences: John Fazakerley.

Academic profile

Admissions 
The university has 11 academic units, some of which incorporate a graduate school. The overall attrition and retention rates at the university are the lowest and highest respectively in Australia. The university has one of the highest admission requirements in the country, with the median ATAR of its undergraduates being 94.05 (2009). 50% of the Premier's VCE Top All-Round High Achievers enrolled at the University of Melbourne.

For domestic applications, an Australian Tertiary Admission Rank (ATAR) is generally required for bachelor's degrees. For undergraduate degrees in 2019, guaranteed entry scores into degrees were: Agriculture 70, Arts 85, Biomedicine 96, Commerce 94, Design 85, Science 85, Oral Health 85 (indicative only), Fine Arts and Music were not applicable.

Domestic applicants who have a disadvantaged financial background, are from rural or isolated areas, are from underrepresented schools, experienced difficult circumstances, have a disability or medical condition, are from a non-English speaking background, identify as an Indigenous Australian, or are applying through a non-school leaver entry pathway may be eligible for the Access Melbourne program. The program offered guaranteed entry in 2023 for students with ATARs of: Agriculture 72, Arts 88, Biomedicine 95, Commerce  93, Design 88, and Science 88. Minimum International Baccalaureate Diploma scores for undergraduate guaranteed entry in 2019 were: Agriculture 25, Arts 31, Biomedicine 38, Commerce 36, design 31, Science 31, Oral Health 31 (indicative only), Fine arts and Music were not applicable.

International students compose 44% of the university's student body.

Teaching structure 

The University of Melbourne differs from other Australian universities in its course structure, as it offers nine generalised three-year degrees instead of more traditional specialised undergraduate degrees. This system, described as the "Melbourne Model", was implemented in 2008 Vice-Chancellor Glyn Davis in 2008. change from the former curriculum, which offered many single and joint degrees, was described by the university as the "Melbourne Model". The university also offers postgraduate courses (including professional-entry master's degrees) that follow undergraduate courses with greater specialisation.

Several professional degrees are available only for graduate entry. These degrees are at a masters level according to the Australian Qualification Framework, but are named "masters" or "doctorate" following the practice in North America. The university's faculties often have a corresponding graduate school to offer these degrees.

Rankings 

Times Higher Education ranked Melbourne 33rd globally (1st nationally) in the 2021-2022 iteration of its annual World University Rankings. In the QS World University Rankings 2023, the University of Melbourne was ranked 33rd globally (2nd in Australia). In 2022, it ranked 33rd among the universities around the world by SCImago Institutions Rankings. In the most recent CWTS Leiden Ranking, Melbourne was ranked 29th in the world (1st nationally). The university was ranked 33rd globally (1st in Australia) in the 2021 publication of the Academic Ranking of World Universities (ARWU) league table. According to QS World University Subject Rankings 2020, the University of Melbourne is ranked 10th in law, 12th in education, 16th in accounting and finance, 17th in social policy and administration, 19th in sociology, 22nd in environmental studies and 23rd in linguistics.

Although the University of Melbourne ranks highly in academic rankings, the university ranks poorly in student satisfaction ratings; in 2021, the University of Melbourne had the lowest student satisfaction out of all Australian universities, with an overall satisfaction rating of 63.1, which was lower than the national average of 73.

Research 
Melbourne University claims that its research expenditure is second only to that of the Commonwealth Scientific and Industrial Research Organisation (CSIRO). The university is a leading Australian research university, with the largest cohort of research students in Australia.

The Performance Ranking of Scientific Papers for World Universities is released by National Taiwan University (NTU Ranking), and placed the University of Melbourne as the 29th highest internationally and 1st domestically in 2018. It evaluates the performance of scientific papers, and the indicators used are designed to compare both the quantity and quality of published scientific works by each university.

Similarly, the Center for World University Rankings (CWUR) ranks universities on variables, including both research output and citations. For 2018/19 it ranked the University of Melbourne at number 57 in the world, and number1 within Australia.

The university is connected to more than 100 research centres and institutes. In 2010 the university spent $813 million on research. In the same year the university had the highest numbers of federal government Australian Postgraduate Awards (APA) and International Postgraduate Research Scholarships (IPRS), as well as the largest totals of Research Higher Degree (RHD) student load (3,222 students) and RHD completions (715).

Entrepreneurship 

The university has an entrepreneurship arm, named the Melbourne Entrepreneurial Centre (MEC). The university also has an accelerator program for start-ups, which has produced a number of small companies. The university also has an entrepreneurial training centre called the Wade Institute of Entrepreneurship based at Ormond College, one of the university's residential colleges.

Libraries 

The University of Melbourne's libraries have over three million visitors performing 42 million loan transactions every year. The general collection comprises over 3.5 million items including books, DVDs, photographic slides, music scores and periodicals as well as rare maps, prints and other published materials. The library also holds over 32,000 e-books, hundreds of databases and 63,000 general and specialist journals in digital form.

Museums

Grainger Museum 

The Grainger Museum is located at the university's Parkville campus, and is the only purpose built autobiographical museum in Australia. It is home to a diverse collection of over 100,000 items including photographs, costumes, art, music scores and instruments. The items were collected by Percy Grainger and span his life and career. Grainger was an eccentric and famous composer, arranger and pianist whose career played a prominent role in the revival of interest in British folk music in the early years of the 20th century.

Harry Brookes Allen Museum of Anatomy and Pathology 
The Harry Brookes Allen Museum of Anatomy and Pathology, located at the Parkville campus, is one of Australia's largest collections of both historical anatomical models and real human tissue specimens. It provides students at The University of Melbourne educational resources for the medical and related anatomical disciplines. The museum is not normally open to the public, though tours of the museum are available for medical students and health professionals.

Henry Forman Atkinson Dental Museum 
The Henry Forman Atkinson Dental Museum is located at the Melbourne Dental School on the Parkville campus. It is the oldest dental collection in Australia, with over 3500 objects, photographs, documents, and catalogues.

Ian Potter Museum of Art 

The Ian Potter Museum of Art is located at the university's Parkville campus, and is the university's main art museum. Since being founded in 1972, the museum has hosted more than 500 exhibitions. The Potter's collection exceeds 16,000 objects, with works ranging from antiquity to contemporary art.

Margaret Lawrence Gallery 
The Margaret Lawrence Gallery is located at the university's Southbank campus in the heart of Melbourne's Arts Precinct. It provides a space for members of the Victorian College of the Arts community to showcase new work, playing an educational role for the institution. The gallery was opened in 2001 to link the Victorian College of the Arts with the University of Melbourne, and to the wider communities of Victorian and national arts. The space facilitates and encourages connections between professional artists, academics, students, and the wider public.

Medical History Museum 
The Medical History Museum is located within the Brownless Biomedical Library at the university's Parkville campus. Exhibitions and educational programs are offered by the museum.

Noel Shaw Gallery 
The Noel Shaw Gallery is located within the Baillieu Library at the university's Parkville campus. It opened in 2014, following a bequest by university alumna, Noel Shaw. Each year two exhibitions are presented in the Noel Shaw Gallery, which focus on the opportunities for curriculum engagement.

Ed Muirhead Physics Museum 
The Ed Muirhead Physics Museum is located at the university's Parkville campus in the School of Physics building. The museum is named in honour of Ed Muirhead, who was the Chairman of the School of Physics from 1980 to 1986, and initiated the museum during that time. The collection comprises items that are of historical and scientific interest, predominantly scientific apparatus constructed by former professors and staff for research purposes.

Dax Centre 
The Dax Centre is located at the university's Parkville campus in the Kenneth Myer Building. The centre is named after Eric Cunningham Dax, who pioneered the use of art to promote clinical insights and mental health improvements. Exhibitions and educational programs hosted by the centre seek to promote mental health. The Dax Centre consists of educational programs and a gallery space and also houses the Cunningham Dax Collection.

Tiegs Museum 
The Tiegs Museum is located at the university's Parkville campus in the BioSciences building. The museum hosts a collection of zoological specimens accumulated over 120 years, and is named after a former professor and faculty dean, Oscar Tiegs. Specimens included in the collection range from small invertebrates to the whole mounts and skeletons of vertebrates including an African Lion, and a moa (an extinct emu-like bird from New Zealand).

Buxton Contemporary 
Buxton Contemporary is an art museum located at the university's Southbank campus, in Melbourne's Arts precinct. The museum was opened in 2018 and comprises four public exhibition galleries, teaching facilities and an outdoor screen for moving image art. The museum was the result of a gift to the university by the art collector and property developer Michael Buxton.

Science Gallery 
Science Gallery Melbourne opened in 2021 at the university's Parkville campus. The 3,500 square metre gallery is in the university's new Melbourne Connect building and presents exhibitions that seek to combine art and science. The gallery forms part of the Global Science Gallery Network, based on the Science Gallery at Trinity College, Dublin.

Herbarium 

The University of Melbourne Herbarium is a teaching and research herbarium within the School of Biosciences.

Student life

Residential colleges

Melbourne University currently has 10 residential colleges in total, seven of which are located in an arc around the cricket oval at the northern edge of the campus, known as College Crescent. The other three are located outside of university grounds.

Most of the university's residential colleges also admit students from RMIT University and Monash University, Parkville campus, with selected colleges also accepting students from the Australian Catholic University and Victoria University.

Graduate House (1972-) is a residential college for graduates located in Parkville's graduate precinct, which began its affiliation with the university in 1972. Whitley College (1965-2017) was a former college of the university, though it was sold to a redeveloper in 2016. Ridley College (1965-2005) was an affiliated residential college of the University of Melbourne and was the first college of the university to be co-residential for men and women.

Student unions and associations 

There are two student organisations within the University of Melbourne, the University of Melbourne Student Union (UMSU), and the Graduate Student Association. The University of Melbourne Student Union, formerly known as the Student Union was founded in 1884. Originally, it was formed to promote common interests of students, to assist social interactions between members, and provide resources for pursuing public life. The union's mission is to create a quality experience on campus by establishing a community for students, staff and visitors from a range of backgrounds and experiences. The Graduate Student Association (GSA) is an independent association that automatically provides all enrolled graduate students at the university with support, representation, events, and training. Some features of the GSA include welcoming students to the graduate school with orientation events, hosting an Annual Art Prize, and a formal Graduate Ball.

Clubs and societies offered by the university range from cultural, course-related, political, language exchange, spiritual and community focuses. There are currently over 200 clubs affiliated to the University of Melbourne Student Union, with the total membership exceeding 25,000. There are currently more than 100 groups affiliated with the GSA, with the total membership exceeding 36,000 students. Specific faculty-based clubs and societies are also offered at the university.

UMSU runs the student magazine Farrago and the Union House Theatre. The Theatre was relocated to the new Arts and Culture Building in 2022, which contains two theatres, the 398-seat Union Theatre and 102-seat Guild Theatre.

Melbourne University Sport

Sport at The University of Melbourne is overseen by Melbourne University Sport (MU Sport), which is a department of the university. The department provides the management of all sports, fitness and recreation facilities, programmes and activities of the university. MU Sport also manages the university's designated entry scheme for elite athletes. Membership to the Melbourne University Sport Fitness Centre is open to University of Melbourne students, staff, alumni, and the greater community at large for those above the age of 17.

Melbourne University Sport offers access to a range of sporting clubs: aikido, athletics, badminton, baseball, basketball, cheerleading, cricket, cycling, dancesport, dragon boat, fencing, men's football, women's football, futsal, gridiron, hockey, inline, karate, kendo, lacrosse, mountaineering, netball, quidditch, rowing, rugby union, skiing, snowboarding, soccer, softball, squash, surf riding, swimming, table tennis, taekwondo-rhee, taekwondo-wtf, tai chi and wushu, tennis, touch football, underwater (SCUBA), ultimate frisbee, volleyball, water polo, waterski and wakeboard, and weightlifting and powerlifting.

The Melbourne University Football Club was established in 1859 and is the world's second oldest Australian rules football club and the second oldest football club in Australia. It achieved prominence by being admitted to what is now the Australian Football League competition in 1908, and in 1914 becoming the first in the league's history to depart the competition, due to the club's strict stance on amateurism. The Melbourne University Lacrosse Club (MULC) was established in 1883 and is the oldest continually operational lacrosse club in the world. The Melbourne University Cycling Club (MUCyc) is associated with Cycling Australia and competes regularly at local and national races. In 2008 MUCyc won its seventh consecutive AUG championship (2002–2008). The Melbourne University Tennis Club was one of the original five clubs established for the students and staff of the university, with various tennis competitions and social tennis events held on campus as early as 1882. The Melbourne University Boat Club was established in 1859 and is cited as "the oldest rowing club in Australia", a team from the Boat Club set the fastest time record for a Men's eight during the 2015 Head of the Yarra rowing regatta. 

The facilities that The University of Melbourne offers include a gym, fitness programs, group fitness classes, cardio theatre, strength zone, group cycling studio, MindBody studio, Cardio Box studio, two multipurpose stadiums, indoor heated 25m lap pool, personal training studio, group fitness room, squash courts, and change rooms.

People

Chancellors 
The following have chaired the University Council and acted as ceremonial heads of the university as its chancellor: 

 The Hon. Sir Redmond Barry, KCMG, BA LLD Dub. Melb & Penn. MA. From 17th May, 1853, to 23rd November, 1880. Died 1880.
 The Hon. Sir William Foster Stawell, KCMG, BA Dub. LLD Dub. & Melb. MA. From 2nd May, 1881, to 8th May, 1882. Died 1889.
 The Rt. Rev. Dr James Moorhouse, DD Camb. MA Camb. & Melb. From 7th July, 1884, to 1st February, 1886. Died 1915.
 The Hon. Dr William Edward Hearn, QC, AM LLD Dub. From 3rd May to 4th October, 1886. Died 1888.
 Sir Anthony Colling Brownless, CMG, MD St. And. & Melb. LLD FRCS. From 4th April 1887 to 3rd December 1897. Died 1897.
 The Hon. Sir John Madden, GCMG, BA LLB LLD. From 20th December, 1897, to 10th March, 1918. Died 1918.
 Sir John Henry MacFarland, Kt, MA Belf. & Camb. LLD. From 8th April, 1918, to 22nd July, 1935. Died 1935.
 Sir James William Barrett, KBE CB CMG, LLD Manit. MD MS Hon. LLD FRCS FRACS. From 30th August, 1935, to 6th March, 1939. Died 1945.
 The Rt. Hon. Sir John Greig Latham, PC GCMG KC, MA LLM Hon. LLD. From 6th March, 1939, to 3rd March, 1941. Died 1964.
 The Hon. Sir Charles John Lowe, KCMG, MA Adel. & Melb. LLB Hon. LLD. From 3rd March, 1941, to 15th March, 1954. Died 1969.
 The Hon. Sir Arthur Dean, Kt QC, LLM Hon. LLD. From 15th March, 1954, to 7th March, 1966. Died 1970.
 Sir William George Dismore Upjohn, Kt OBE, MD MS Hon. LLD FRCS FRACS. From 7th March, 1966, to 6th March, 1967. Died 1979.
 The Rt. Hon. Sir Robert Gordon Menzies, KT AK CH QC Constable of Dover Castle, Lord Warden of Cinque Ports, LLM Hon. LLD (Brist. Belf. Melb. Br. Col. Syd. McGill Malta Laval Tas. Camb. Harv. Leeds Adel. Q'ld Edin. Birm. A.N.U. Sus. Drury College and Calif.), Hon. DCL Oxf. Kent Hon. D.Litt W.Aust. Hon. DSc N.S.W. Hon. FAHA Hon. MAustMM FRS Hon. FRCS Barrister-at-Law. From 6th March, 1967 to 6th March, 1972. Died 1978.
 Leonard William Weickhardt, CBE, Hon. DASc V.I.C. MSc Hon. LLD FIChemE FRACI. From 6th March 1972 to 18th March,1978. Died July 2000.
 The Hon. Sir Oliver James Gillard, Kt, BA LLB. From 18th March 1978 to 3rd March 1980. Died 1984.
 Professor Emeritus Sir Roy Douglas Wright, AK, DSc A.N.U. & Melb. Hon.LLD A.N.U. & Melb. MB MS FRACP. From 3rd March 1980 to 31st December 1989. Died 1990.
 The Hon Sir (Albert) Edward Woodward, AC Kt OBE QC, LLM Melb. HonLLD NSW HonDLitt Ballarat. From 1 January 1990 to 2nd February 2001. Died April 2010.
 Fay Surtees Marles, AM MA Melb. DipSocSt Melb. From 3rd February 2001 to 31st December 2004.
 Ian Andrew Renard, AM BA Melb. LLM Melb. From 1 January 2005 to 9 January 2009.
 The Hon. Mr Alex Chernov, AO QC AC BCom LLB (Hons) Melb. From 10 January 2009 to 7 April 2011.
 Elizabeth Alexander, AO. From 8 April 2011 to 31 December 2016.
 Allan Myers, AC KC. From 1 January 2017 to 31 December 2022.
 Jane Hansen, AO. From 1 January 2023 to Present.

Vice-chancellors 
The following have led the university as its vice-chancellor:
Duncan Maskell: 1 October 2018 – present
Glyn Davis: 10 January 2005 – 30 September 2018
Kwong Lee Dow: 1 February 2004 – 9 January 2005
Alan Gilbert: 1 January 1996 – 31 January 2004
David Penington: 1 January 1988 – 31 December 1995
David Caro: 1 June 1982 – 31 December 1987
Sir David Derham: 1 March 1968 – 31 May 1982
Sir George Paton: 1 July 1951 – 29 February 1968
Sir John Medley: 1 July 1938 – 1 July 1951
Sir Raymond Priestley: 1 January 1935 – 30 June 1938
Sir James Barrett: 7 December 1931 – 17 December 1934
Sir John Monash: 2 July 1923 – 8 October 1931
Sir John Grice: 6 May 1918 – 18 June 1923
Sir John MacFarland: 7 March 1910 – 8 April 1918
Sir Henry Wrixon: 20 December 1897 – 7 March 1910
Sir John Madden: 3 June 1889 – 20 December 1897
Martin Irving: 2 May 1887 – 27 May 1889
Sir Anthony Brownless: 31 May 1858 – 4 April 1887
William Haines: 15 May 1857 – 31 May 1858
Hugh Childers: 17 May 1853 – 12 March 1857

Nobel laureates 
Many Nobel laureates have taught, studied and researched at the University of Melbourne. Graduates include:

 Elizabeth Blackburn, Nobel Prize in Physiology or Medicine (2009)
 Sir John Eccles, Nobel Prize in Physiology or Medicine (1963)
 Sir Frank Macfarlane Burnet, Nobel Prize in Physiology or Medicine (1960)
 Joshua Lederberg, Nobel Prize in Physiology or Medicine (1958)
 Howard Florey, Nobel Prize in Physiology or Medicine (1945)
 Sir James Mirrlees, Nobel Prize in Economic Science (1996)
 Bert Sakmann, Nobel Prize in Physiology or Medicine (1991)

Notable alumni 
The University of Melbourne has produced many notable alumni, with graduates having been Governor-General of Australia, Governor of Victoria, Prime Minister of Australia, justices of the High, Federal, Family and Victorian Supreme courts, Premiers of Victoria and elected leaders of other states and territories, Nobel laureates, a First Lady of East Timor, ministers of foreign countries, Lord mayors, academics, architects, historians, poets, philosophers, politicians, scientists, physicists, authors, industry leaders, defence force personnel, corporate leaders, community leaders, as well as numerous artists. Frances Dorothy Gray became Australia's first female Bachelor of Dental Science graduate, when she graduated from the Australian College of Dentistry at the University of Melbourne in 1907.

Awards
 The University of Melbourne Award "recognises individuals who have made an outstanding and enduring contribution to the University and its scholarly community". Recipients of the award are acknowledged by bronze commemorative plaques along Professors Walk on the Parkville campus.
The Patricia Grimshaw Awards for Mentor Excellence are awarded annually to staff at the University of Melbourne to recognise mentoring skills and behaviours. The award was launched by the university in March 2008 to honour historian Patricia Grimshaw's "contribution as a mentor of postgraduate students and younger colleagues".

Gallery

See also

Centre of Excellence for Biosecurity Risk Analysis (CEBRA) – within the School of Biosciences
List of universities in Australia
 NICTA – national information and communication technology research centre, co-supported by Melbourne University
 University of Melbourne Academic Dress
 Victorian School of Forestry

References

Citations

Sources 

 Books
 Macintyre, S. & Selleck, R.J.W. (2003). A short history of the University of Melbourne. Melbourne: Melbourne University Press. .
 Selleck, R.J.W. (2003). The Shop: The University of Melbourne, 1850–1939. Melbourne: University of Melbourne Press. 930pp
 Poynter, John & Rasmussen, Carolyn (1996). A Place Apart – The University of Melbourne: Decades of Challenge. Melbourne: Melbourne University Press. .
 Cain J II and J Hewitt. (2004). Off Course: From Public Place to Marketplace at Melbourne University. Melbourne: Scribe. review 

 Newspaper
 McPhee, P. 2005. "From the Acting Vice-Chancellor." Uni News. The University of Melbourne. 03/10/05, p. 3.

External links 

 University website
 Bibliography of the history of the University of Melbourne

 
Australian vocational education and training providers
Educational institutions established in 1853
Universities in Melbourne
1853 establishments in Australia
Group of Eight (Australian universities)
Universities established in the 19th century
Landmarks in Melbourne
City of Melbourne